Ingemar Ragnemalm is a Swedish computer programmer. He is best known for writing the Sprite Animation Toolkit, which was used in a number of video games for MacOS in the 1990s.

Personal life
He has a PhD in image processing and works as software developer and university teacher. He is the nephew of Hans Ragnemalm.

References

External links 
 Home page of Ingemar Ragnemalm
 Course pages of Ingemar Ragnemalm
 

Living people
Video game programmers
Computer graphics professionals
Year of birth missing (living people)